The 1949 Ostzonenmeisterschaft season was the first season of ice hockey in what became East Germany. Four teams participated in the league, and SG Frankenhausen won the championship. It was played on 11–13 February 1949 in Oberhof.

Semifinals
 SG Frankenhausen 5–2 SG Apolda
 Grün-Weiß Pankow 6–0 SG Schierke

3rd place
 SG Apolda 5–2 SG Schierke

Final 
 SG Frankenhausen 8–2 Grün-Weiß Pankow

References

External links
East German results 1949-1970
Ger
East